Dennison is a historic railway station located at 400 Center Street in Dennison, Ohio. The depot was built between 1884 and 1900, and the baggage room was built circa 1912. The station is located midway between Dennison and Uhrichsville, Ohio, and served both communities.

The depot is best known as the home of the Dennison Depot Salvation Army Servicemen's Canteen during World War II. The canteen, which operated from 1942 through 1946, served refreshments to troop trains passing through Dennison. Dennison native Lucille Nussdorfer proposed the canteen; the Salvation Army and a citizens' committee operated it under the direction of Salvation Army Captain Edward Johnson. As Dennison was a division point on the Pennsylvania Railroad, every train that passed through Dennison stopped there; since the canteen workers vowed to serve every soldier passing through the station, the canteen ultimately served 1.3 million soldiers, 13% of the U.S. forces. 4,000 volunteers, the majority of them women from the surrounding area, worked the canteen during the war; the canteen was the third-largest Salvation Army canteen in the nation. The canteen became well known among soldiers, and its fame spread across the eastern U.S.; it appeared in newspapers as far away as Pittsfield, Massachusetts, was compared favorably to canteens in New York City and Chicago, and led Captain Johnson to become a recognizable figure on the East Coast. Soldiers nicknamed Dennison "Dreamsville, U.S.A.", a reference to an ideal small town in a Glenn Miller song.

The station was added to the National Register of Historic Places on September 8, 1976, as the Pennsylvania Railroad Depot and Baggage Room. It was designated as a National Historic Landmark on June 17, 2011.  It is now a local history museum.

References

External links

Dennison Depot website
National Register of Historic Places Program: Women's History Month Feature 2012 - Pennsylvania Railroad Depot And Baggage Room, Dennison, Ohio

Railway stations on the National Register of Historic Places in Ohio
National Historic Landmarks in Ohio
Buildings and structures in Tuscarawas County, Ohio
National Register of Historic Places in Tuscarawas County, Ohio
Former Pennsylvania Railroad stations
United States home front during World War II
Railroad-related National Historic Landmarks
Salvation Army buildings
Museums in Tuscarawas County, Ohio
History museums in Ohio
Railroad museums in Ohio
Former railway stations in Ohio